is a Japanese volleyball player who plays for Hisamitsu Springs. She also plays for the All-Japan women's volleyball team.

Imamura played for the All-Japan team for the first time at the Montreux Volley Masters in June 2013.

Clubs
  SundaiGakuen Junior High
  SundaiGakuen Highschool
  Aoyama Gakuin University (2012-15)
  Hisamitsu Springs (2015-

Awards

Individuals
2013 Kantō Collegiate League (Spring) - Best Scorer, Spike award
2017 VTV International Women's Volleyball Cup - MVP

Clubs
2012 Kantō Collegiate League (Autumn) -  Champion, with Aoyama Gakuin University.
2013 Kantō Collegiate League (Spring) -  Champion, with Aoyama Gakuin University.

References

External links
 
 

Japanese women's volleyball players
Living people
1993 births
People from Tokyo
Universiade medalists in volleyball
Universiade bronze medalists for Japan
Medalists at the 2017 Summer Universiade
21st-century Japanese women